Thomas Davidson (6 August 1906 – 13 January 1987) was a South African cricketer. He played in eight first-class matches from 1926/27 to 1938/39.

References

External links
 

1906 births
1987 deaths
South African cricketers
Border cricketers
Rhodesia cricketers
Western Province cricketers
People from Uitenhage
Cricketers from the Eastern Cape